Port Hope Simpson is a town located on the southeastern Labrador coast,  from the Quebec/Southern Labrador border in Canada. It was founded in 1934 by Kaden Russell as a company town.

With the completion of the Trans-Labrador Highway that crosses the region, the town has benefitted from an increase in tourism.

The nearby Shinneys Water Complex has  of over 1,000 islands rising dramatically above sea level. These protected waters are ideal for all types of boating and the adjoining Alexis River is a popular fishing destination for Atlantic salmon.

History 

When the Labrador Development Company left in 1948, paid work in the woods left with it until Bowater arrived 14 years later.
The first post office was established on October 21, 1950. The first postmaster was Hayward Green. At the time, the population was 311.

New economic activity took place between 1962 and 1968 as Bowater picked up the pioneering venture laid down by John Osborn Williams, Sir John Hope Simpson and the Labrador Development Company. More trees were felled for their pulp and paper mills at Corner Brook, and in Kent, England. Bowater brought benefits of regular paid employment (though seasonal),  of forest roads and the government contributed by sharing the cost of building a new wharf. But apart from the post office, the general store and the two schools there was no all-year-round paid employment from 1969 to 1970.

From 1970 to 1992 cod and salmon fishing was the economic mainstay of the area but unemployment prevailed most of the year. In 1992 the cod fishery was closed down altogether. However, many local fishermen made a relatively easy transition into crab, shrimp and scallop fishing.

Government funding for the construction works of the Trans-Labrador Highway, the Port Hope Simpson bridge and the Port Hope Simpson Airport has increased the town's accessibility as a tourist destination on the Labrador coast.

From the early 1990s on, Port Hope Simpson's fishing, logging, timber products, transportation, retail and public services, tourist facilities and amenities have contributed to the sustainable growth of the town.

The town previously served as a ferry port for the nearby town of William's Harbour. William's Harbour was entirely resettled in 2017. The town has a small air-strip, Port Hope Simpson Airport. As of March 2017, Port Hope is not listed as a scheduled destination in the Air Labrador flight schedule.

Demographics 

References

External links

Southeastern Aurora Development Corporation 2002;
Alexis Bay History
Canadian Statistics
Our Labrador...Yours to Explore, Smart Labrador and Combined Councils of Labrador 1995;
Labrador Coastal Drive
Port Hope Simpson - Encyclopedia of Newfoundland and Labrador, vol. 4, p. 395-396.

Populated coastal places in Canada
Populated places in Labrador
Towns in Newfoundland and Labrador